The Randsburg Railway was a  branch line railroad in California's Mojave Desert. It originated at the main line of the Atchison, Topeka, and Santa Fe Railroad (AT&SF) at Kramer Junction, California, and terminated at Johannesburg, California, with a stop at Atolia. The Railway served as a supply link to the Rand Mine, which produced more silver than any mine in California.  The Rand mine closed in 1929, as it was no longer profitable.

The line was completed on January 5, 1898, and began operation on January 17, 1898.  The railway was acquired by the AT&SF in 1903. During its 35-year history, the Randsburg Railway served a number of local mining operations; it also provided passenger service.

The Randsburg Railway ceased operations on December 30, 1933, a victim of the Great Depression
and a decline in the mining industry. The rails were removed the following year. Portions of the grade are still visible along U.S. Route 395 between Kramer and Johannesburg.

See also

Trona Railway
Calico and Odessa Railroad
Death Valley Railroad

References

External links
Randsburg/Johannesburg Railroad

Defunct California railroads
History of the Mojave Desert region
Predecessors of the Atchison, Topeka and Santa Fe Railway
Railway companies established in 1897
Railway companies disestablished in 1911
Mining in California
History of Kern County, California